__notoc__

In geometry, the Fuhrmann circle of a triangle, named after the German Wilhelm Fuhrmann (1833–1904), is the circle with a diameter of the line segment between the orthocenter  and the Nagel point . This circle is identical with the circumcircle of the Fuhrmann triangle. 

The radius of the Fuhrmann circle of a triangle with sides a, b, and c and circumradius R is

 

which is also the distance between the circumcenter and incenter.

Aside from the orthocenter the Fuhrmann circle intersects each altitude of the triangle in one additional point. Those points all have the distance  from their associated vertices of the triangle. Here  denotes the radius of the triangles incircle.

Notes

Further reading 
Nguyen Thanh Dung: "The Feuerbach Point and the Fuhrmann Triangle". Forum Geometricorum, Volume 16 (2016), pp. 299–311.
 J. A. Scott: An Eight-Point Circle. In: The Mathematical Gazette, Volume 86, No. 506 (Jul., 2002), pp. 326–328 (JSTOR)

External links 
Fuhrmann circle

Circles defined for a triangle